Khương Hữu Bá  (1930 – 21 December 2015) was a South Vietnamese naval officer in the Republic of Vietnam Navy. He is a direct descendant of a well established and aristocrat family Khương Hữu ̣(refer to Khuong-huu  family website for additional family information). He is married to Mrs. Khương Trần Ngọc Lê (sister of prominent Attorney at Law and Minister Tran Ngoc Lieng).

Education
He completed the French Preparatory School Lasan Taberd and earned the French Baccalaureate Diploma with "Prix Excellence" recognition. He attended and graduated from the French established Merchant Marine & French Naval Academy (in Nha Trang,  Viet Nam), and the following Post-Graduate schools: U.S. General Line at Monterey, U.S. Naval War College (post graduate studies), and Supreme Defense War College.

Military service

Under the command of Captain Khương, RVNS Huong Giang (HQ-404) was the very first Vietnamese Navy ship (with an entire Vietnamese crew) to have crossed the Pacific Ocean from the US back to South Vietnam, unescorted.

Having served in several "command-at-sea" positions, Khương was one of the most highly decorated commanding officers in the South Vietnamese Navy to have earned Bão Quốc Huy Chương, đệ IV đẵng (an equivalent to the U.S. Medal of Honor), the South Vietnam Naval Command Medal, 1st class, and Medal of Honor, 1st class.

Khương held the following high ranking "Flag Commanding Officer" positions in the South Vietnamese Navy:
 Supreme Commander of Naval National Coastal Fleet - 1960-1962 (Chỉ Huy Trưởng Lực Lượng Hãi Thuyền);
 General Chief Inspector of the Navy (Chánh Thanh Tra)- 1966–1968;
 Superintendent of the South Vietnamese Naval Academy 1968-1971(Chỉ Huy Trưởng Trung Tâm Huấn Luyện Sĩ Quan Hải Quân Nha Trang);
 General Chief Inspector of the Navy (Chánh Thanh Tra)- 1972–1973;
 Fourth Coastal Zone Naval Commander & Army Regiment Military Special Zone Commander 1974-1975(Tư Lệnh Vùng IV Duyên Hải)

Khương, along with several other most senior flag officers and generals of the Armed Forces (one of whom was Air Marshall, later, Prime Minister Nguyễn Cao Kỳ) signed The Constitution of the first Republic of South Vietnam, otherwise known as, Hiến Chương Vuñg Tàu.

These positions report directly to the Chief of Naval Operations, Defense Minister, and Prime Minister, and are normally under the command of flag officers (Fleet Admiral). US Navy flag officers Rear Admiral Charles F. Rauch and US Navy Admiral Elmo R. Zumwalt Jr. (later was US Chief of Naval Operations "CNO") served as Khương's American Navy advisors between 1968 - 1972. The captain of the aircraft carrier USS Enterprise - Navy Captain Hayvard (as seen in picture below greeted Khương as he visited the US 7th Fleet in 1970) was also Khuong's advisor.

Medals
He earned South Vietnam "Congress National Medal of Honor - Bão Quốc Huy Chương, đệ IV đẵngSouth Vietnam Naval Command Medal, 1st classMedal of Honor, 1st class.

Photos
Bá Hữu Khương Navy Photos

Life in exile

After the defeat of South Vietnam by North Vietnam in 1975, Khương commanded a South Vietnamese Naval Fleet and fled South Vietnam. He then went to the United States, (he led and returned a significant number of Navy Ships back to US. at the Philippines) and settled in Chicago where he worked as an office manager for a jewelry business until his retirement. Khương resides in the United States with his wife Trần Ngọc Lê - sister of prominent lawyer Tran Ngoc Lieng, 4 children and 7 Grand children.

References

External links
 Grand-Family History - Gia Phả Đại Gia Đình Khương Hữu 
 Personal History 
 Vietnam Navy - Hải Quân VNCH 
 French Preparatory School - Lasan Taberd SàiGòn 
 History of Khương Last Name - Dòng Họ Khương 

1930 births
Vietnamese admirals
Vietnamese emigrants to the United States
Vietnamese anti-communists
Republic of Vietnam Navy
South Vietnamese military personnel of the Vietnam War
2015 deaths